Gevaro Giomar Magno Nepomuceno (born 10 November 1992) is a Curaçaoan professional footballer who plays as a winger for Melbourne Knights and the Curaçao national team.

Club career
Born in Willemstad, Curaçao and raised in the Netherlands, Nepomuceno started playing football when he was 12 years old, with his friends. In the next two years, it became "something important", as he said. After playing for multiple clubs in the Netherlands, Nepomuceno joined Romanian side Petrolul Ploiești during the summer of 2014, at the age of 21. The manager who brought him, Cosmin Contra, revealed that they were initially scouting Patrick N'Koyi, the centre forward who was also transferred by Petrolul from the same team, Fortuna Sittard. He made his debut in a UEFA Europa League qualifying phase match against Flamurtari Vlorë of Albania, also scoring for an eventual 2–0 win at home. On 9 April 2015, in the Romanian League, Nepomuceno netted a late winning goal against defending champions Steaua București.

On 5 September 2017, Nepomuceno signed a one-year contract, with an option for a further year, with League One side Oldham Athletic. He was released by the Oldham club in July 2020 and signed for National League side FC Halifax Town on 3 October 2020. On 2 January 2021, Nepomuceno was released by FC Halifax Town following the end of his short-term contract.

In January 2021, he signed a six-months contract with an option for two further years with Romanian club Dinamo București.

In January 2023, he signed with Australian semi-pro outfit Melbourne Knights.

International career
In September 2014, Nepomuceno was called up for the first time to the senior Curaçaoan national team, to take part at the Caribbean Cup qualification campaign. He scored his first goal on the 5th, against Grenada. Curaçao won the match 2–1. On 13 November, Nepomuceno scored against Cuba, but his team lost 2–3 and eventually failed to progress to the final stage of the Caribbean Cup.

International stats

International goals
As of match played 19 November 2018. Curaçao score listed first, score column indicates score after each Nepomuceno goal.

Personal life
Nepomuceno was born in Willemstad, Curaçao.  He is of Curaçaoan origin, and has one brother and two sisters.

Career statistics

Honours

International
Curaçao
 Caribbean Cup: 2017
 King's Cup: 2019

References

External links
 Voetbal International profile 
 
 
 
 Gevaro Nepomuceno Interview

1992 births
Living people
Association football wingers
Dutch footballers
Dutch people of Curaçao descent
Curaçao footballers
Curaçao international footballers
FC Den Bosch players
Fortuna Sittard players
FC Petrolul Ploiești players
C.S. Marítimo players
F.C. Famalicão players
Oldham Athletic A.F.C. players
Chesterfield F.C. players
FC Halifax Town players
FC Dinamo București players
Eerste Divisie players
Liga I players
Footballers from Tilburg
2014 Caribbean Cup players
2017 CONCACAF Gold Cup players
Curaçao expatriate footballers
Dutch expatriate footballers
Curaçaon expatriates in Romania
Dutch expatriate sportspeople in Romania
Expatriate footballers in Romania
Expatriate footballers in England
2019 CONCACAF Gold Cup players
Curaçao expatriate sportspeople in Australia
Expatriate soccer players in Australia
Curaçao expatriate sportspeople in England
Curaçao expatriate sportspeople in Portugal
Expatriate footballers in Portugal
Curaçao expatriate sportspeople in Bulgaria
Dutch expatriate sportspeople in Bulgaria
Expatriate footballers in Bulgaria
Dutch expatriate sportspeople in Portugal
Dutch expatriate sportspeople in England
Dutch expatriate sportspeople in Australia